Písečné is a municipality and village in Jindřichův Hradec District in the South Bohemian Region of the Czech Republic. It has about 500 inhabitants.

Administrative parts
Villages of Chvaletín, Marketa, Modletice, Nové Sady, Slavětín and Václavov are administrative parts of Písečné.

References

Villages in Jindřichův Hradec District